Peștera Vântului (Wind Cave) is the largest cave in Romania, with a length of almost 52 km (total length of passages). It is situated in the Pădurea Craiului Mountains on the left bank of Crișul Repede River in the vicinity of Șuncuiuș village, Bihor County. This cave is closed and only accessible to cavers, but there are works going on to develop it as a show cave.

The cave is called Peștera Vântului (Romanian for "Wind Cave") because of the powerful draft that can be sensed at the entrance and in the far corners of the cave. The wind is bi-directional, being controlled seasonally. 

The average temperature in the cave is 11.8˚C.

External links 
  Peştera Vântului - Official Site (in Romanian)
 Peştera Vântului - history, geology, biology, tourism
 Pictures of Peştera Vântului
 The Cave of the Wind with pictures
 suncuius.ro - Suncuius tourism zone: photos, weather, access and housing information
  Photos from Wind Cave - Szilagyi Palko Pal CSA Cluj

Caves of Romania
Wild caves
Geography of Bihor County